María Ángela Leyva Tagle (born November 22, 1996, in Lima, Peru) is a peruvian volleyball player who plays for the Peru national team. At the age of 14 she had already been in all categories of Peru's national team, Child (U16), Youth (U18), Junior (U20) and Senior.

Leyva was captain of the team that won gold at the 2012 Youth South American Championship, the first gold medal for Peruvian volleyball in that category after 32 years and the first gold in any category in 19 years.

Career

2010-2011
Leyva first started playing volleyball at Camino de Vida Volleyball Club in the Peruvian National League. At the age of 14 she was named captain of the U16 squad with looks for the first South American Championship of that category.

She was invited to be a part of the Peruvian senior team for the 2011 Montreux Volley Masters.

When Camino de Vida Volleyball Club dissolved, Cenaida Uribe, Peruvian ex-volleyball player and Olympic silver medalist made the club into Universidad San Martín. Leyva stayed in the team and was joined by international figures such as Dominican Republic's Cándida Arias. The club finished second in their first season at the LNSV.

Leyva then participated in the first U16 South American Championship. The team captained by Leyva defeated Brazil for the first time in 19 years. Peru finished second at the tournament and Leyva was named Best Spiker and Best Scorer.

Leyva was once again invited to play for the senior team at the 2012 Pan American Cups, first at the Senior Pan-American Cup and then at the U23 Cup. Leyva then participated in the 2012 South American Junior Championship where the Peruvian team finished second; Leyva was named Best Server.

2012: South American Gold
Leyva was captain of the team that won gold at the 2012 Youth South American Championship, the first gold medal for Peruvian volleyball in that category after 32 years and the first gold in any category in 19 years. Leyva was named Best Scorer, Spiker and Most Valuable Player of the tournament.

2013: World Championships
Leyva was part of both the junior and the youth Peruvian teams that competed at the 2013 world championships, in June, at the Junior World Championship, Peruvian girls finished in 12th place and Leyva was the third best scorer of the tournament.

At the Youth World Championship, with the nickname "Dark Horses" Peruvian girls reached the semifinals of the tournament for the first time in 20 years and for the second time ever, Leyva was captain of the team. At the semifinals against China, Peru and China played until the tie-break where Peru had 10 match points but China saved them all, at the end the Chinese won the match 3–2. Peru eventually finished 4th after losing the bronze medal to classic rival Brazil. Leyva was part of the ideal team being awarded as Best Opposite.

2015
Leyva won the Best Opposite individual award from the 2015 Pan-American Cup and her national team ranked in ninth place. She then won the Best Outside Hitter and the silver medal in the 2015 South American Championship.

2017
For the 2017/18 season, she played on loan with the Brazilian club Osasco Voleibol Clube, working under the same head coach as the Peruvian national team. She won the silver medal in the 2017 Bolivarian Games under 23 tournament.

2018

Leyva decided not to be part of the Peruvian team due to a shoulder injury that made it impossible for her to play. She will return to wear the national shirt for the season of selections 2019. For the 2018/19 season, she renewed a contract with the Brazilian club Osasco Voleibol Clube for this season. 
According to Cenaida Uribe, clubs from Italy, USA and Turkey want it, but especially the Italian club Pallavolo Scandicci for two seasons, but both parties did not reach an agreement.

Clubs
  Camino de Vida (2010–2011)
  Universidad San Martín (2011–2017)
  Osasco Voleibol Clube (2017–2019)
  PTT Spor Kulübü (2019-2020)
  VC Yenisey Krasnoyarsk (2020-2021)
  Béziers Volley (2021-2022)
  Çukurova Belediyespor (2022-)

Awards

Individuals
 2011 U16 South American Championship "Best Spiker"
 2011 U16 South American Championship "Best Scorer"
 2012 Liga Nacional Juvenil de Voleibol Femenino "Best Scorer"
 2012 Liga Nacional Juvenil de Voleibol Femenino "Best Spiker"
 2012 Junior South American Championship "Best Server"
 2012 Youth South American Championship "Best Spiker"
 2012 Youth South American Championship "Most Valuable Player"
 2013 Copa Latina "Best Spiker"
 2013 FIVB Girls Youth World Championship "Best Opposite"
 2014 South American Club Championship " Best Outside Spiker"
 2014 Women's U22 South American Championship "Most Valuable Player"
 2014 Final Four Cup "Best Receiver"
 2015 South American Club Championship "Best Outside Spiker"
 2014–15 Liga Nacional Superior de Voleibol Femenino "Best Outside Spiker"
 2014–15 Liga Nacional Superior de Voleibol Femenino "Best Spiker"
 2015 Copa Latina U20 "Best Opposite"
 2015 Copa Latina U20 "Most Valuable Player"
 2015 South American World Cup Qualifier "Best Opposite"
 2015 Pan-American Cup "Best Opposite"
 2015 South American Championship "Best Outside Hitter"
 2016 Summer Olympics South American qualification tournament "Best Outside Hitter"
 2016 South American Club Championship "Best Outside Spiker"
 2015–16 Liga Nacional Superior de Voleibol Femenino "Best Outside Spiker"
 2015–16 Liga Nacional Superior de Voleibol Femenino "Most Valuable Player"
 2016 Women's U22 South American Championship "Best Outside Spiker"
 2016 U23 Pan-American Cup "Best Outside Spiker"
 2017 South American Club Championship "Best Outside Spiker"
 2016–17 Liga Nacional Superior de Voleibol Femenino "Best Outside Spiker"
 2016–17 Liga Nacional Superior de Voleibol Femenino "Best Scorer"
 2017 South American Championship "Best Outside Hitter"

National Team
 2013 Bolivarian Games –  Gold Medal
 2015 South American Championship –  Silver Medal

Junior Team
 2010 Youth South American Championship –  Bronze Medal
 2011 U16 South American Championship –  Silver Medal
 2012 Junior South American Championship –  Silver Medal
 2012 Youth South American Championship –  Gold Medal
 2014 Junior South American Championship –  Silver Medal
 2014 Junior Final Four Cup –  Gold Medal
 2016 U22 South American Championship –  Bronze Medal

Clubs
 2011-12 Liga Nacional Superior de Voleibol Femenino –  Runner-up with Universidad San Martín
 2012-13 Liga Nacional Superior de Voleibol Femenino –  Runner-up with Universidad San Martín
 2013-14 Liga Nacional Superior de Voleibol Femenino – Champion with Universidad San Martín
 2014-15 Liga Nacional Superior de Voleibol Femenino – Champion with Universidad San Martín
 2015 South American Club Championship  Bronze with Universidad San Martín
 2015-16 Liga Nacional Superior de Voleibol Femenino – Champion with Universidad San Martín
 2016 South American Club Championship  Silver with Universidad San Martín
 2017 South American Club Championship  Bronze with Universidad San Martín
 2018 Copa Brasil de Voleibol Feminino  Gold with Osasco Voleibol Clube
 2017-18 Brazilian Women's Volleyball Superliga – 4th place with Osasco Voleibol Clube
 2017-18 Liga Nacional Superior de Voleibol Femenino – Champion with Universidad San Martín
 2018 Campeonato Paulista de Voleibol Feminino –  Runner-up with Osasco Voleibol Clube
 2018 Supercopa Brasileira de Voleibol –  Runner-up with Osasco Voleibol Clube

References

External links
 FIVB Profile
 

1996 births
Living people
Sportspeople from Lima
Volleyball players at the 2015 Pan American Games
Peruvian women's volleyball players
Pan American Games competitors for Peru
21st-century Peruvian women